The ARIA Albums Chart ranks the best-performing albums and extended plays in Australia. Its data, published by the Australian Recording Industry Association, is based collectively on each album and EP's weekly physical and digital sales. In 2014, thirty-one albums claimed the top spot, including Michael Bublé's Christmas, which started its peak position in 2011. Ten acts achieved their first number-one album in Australia: Beyoncé, Avicii, MKTO, Pharrell Williams, Chet Faker, The Black Keys, Sia, Vance Joy, The Madden Brothers and Barbra Streisand.

INXS' The Very Best was the longest-running number-one album of 2014, having topped the ARIA Albums Chart for seven weeks. Ed Sheeran's x was the second longest-running number-one album, with six weeks at the top spot. Taylor Swift's 1989 spent four weeks atop the chart, while Beyoncé's self-titled album and Coldplay's Ghost Stories both topped the chart for three consecutive weeks. Faker's Built on Glass and Hilltop Hoods's Walking Under Stars both spent two consecutive weeks at number one.

Chart history

Number-one artists

See also
2014 in music
List of number-one singles of 2014 (Australia)
List of Top 25 albums for 2014 in Australia

References

2014
Australia Albums
2014 in Australian music